Vizhaikha is a rural locality (a settlement) in Cherdynsky District, Perm Krai, Russia. The population was 111 as of 2010. There are 4 streets.

Geography 
Vizhaikha is located 57 km north of Cherdyn (the district's administrative centre) by road. Nyrob is the nearest rural locality.

References 

Rural localities in Cherdynsky District